Sanjak of Krka was a frontier sanjak (serhad) of the Ottoman Empire.

History
In 1580, Ferhad Pasha Sokolović became the first governor (beylerbey or simply pasha) of the Beylerbeylik of Bosnia. The Bosnia Eyalet (or Pashaluk) comprised a total of ten sanjaks: Sanjak of Bosnia (central province), Sanjak of Herzegovina, Sanjak of Vučitrn, Sanjak of Prizren, Sanjak of Klis, Sanjak of Krka, and Sanjak of Pakrac.

The sanjak had territory from Lika to Krbava, and the areas between Zrmanja and Krka, and had its seat in Knin. It was formed out of territories that had been part of the Sanjak of Klis and Sanjak of Bosnia.

The sanjak had  30 nahiye.

Governors

Arnaud Mehmed Memi-beg, first
stari Memi-beg (?)
Jusuf-alajbeg (?)
Halil-beg (?)
Rustem-beg (?)
Mustaj-beg/Mustafa-beg (?)
Halil-beg Alajbegović (?–1647)
Muhamed Durakbegović (fl. 1675)

Annotations
Sometimes known in Serbo-Croatian historiography as "Sanjak of Krka and Lika" (Krčko-lički sandžak).

References

Krka
Ottoman period in the history of Croatia
16th century in Croatia
17th century in Croatia
1580 establishments in the Ottoman Empire
1688 disestablishments in the Ottoman Empire